Raymond of Tripoli may refer to:

Raymond I of Tripoli (Raymond IV, Count of Toulouse), (c. 1041 or 1042 –1105), Count of Toulouse, Duke of Narbonne, Margrave of Provence and a leader of the First Crusade
Raymond II, Count of Tripoli (c.1115–1152)
Raymond III, Count of Tripoli (1140–1187), also Prince of Galilee and Tiberias 
Raymond IV, Count of Tripoli (died 1199), also prince regent of Antioch